Infinite Discs is an American disc golf equipment retail company based in Logan, Utah. The company also maintains a disc golf scorekeeping app, a course directory, a round tracking website, and a line of discs.

History 
The company was founded by amateur disc golfer Alan Barker on October 15, 2012 in Logan, Utah. Barker was initially making real estate websites, until one of his employees introduced him to disc golf. They later created Disc Golf Reviewer, a review blog with Amazon and eBay affiliate links. To grow beyond affiliate marketing, Barker looked into ways to better monetize his blog. He considered striking a partnership with Altitude Disc Golf, a local Utah disc golf retailer, but the company was going out of business. He offered to buy it out, but eventually launched Infinite Discs.

Company overview 
Infinite Discs is one of the largest disc golf retailers in the United States, with three brick-and-mortar locations (in Logan, Utah, in Pocatello, Idaho, and in St. George, Utah) and an online store with 50,000 discs in stock.

Infinite Tournaments 
Infinite Tournaments is an online platform for running tournaments, raising funds, and providing player ratings. The platform is notably used by the Next Gen Tour.

Infinite Discs Line 
In early 2018, Infinite Discs released a line of disc golf discs manufactured by Innova Champion Discs in the United States. The molds follow an Ancient Egyptian-themed naming pattern. Later in 2020 Infinite Discs Released a follow-up line of disc molds following a naming pattern of Pre-Columbian era civilizations of Central and South America. Infinite discs are sold exclusively by Infinite Discs in both sets and individually. In 2020, Infinite Discs was the 6th most popular brand of discs among Utahn players, after Innova, Discraft, and trilogy brands (Dynamic Discs, Latitude 64°, and Westside).

State of Disc Golf Survey 
Since at least 2014, Infinite Discs has been publishing the State of Disc Golf Survey, a yearly account of the state of the disc golf industry. Data collected from the survey plays an important role in assessing the growth of the sport in terms of market trends and consumer habits.

Sponsorships 
Events
In 2019, Infinite Discs Idaho sponsored a Fourth of July disc golf event in Pocatello. Infinite Discs is one of the primary sponsors of the Cache Valley Disc Golf Club. Since 2020, it is the official vendor of the Ledgestone Insurance Open.
Players
In 2020, Infinite Discs sponsored 108 American disc golf players from 35 states.

  Boston Abbinett 
  Richard Alexander 
  Jebediah Anderson 
  Ryan Anderson 
  Zoe AnDyke 
  Taylor Aubuchon 
  Mikey Barringer 
  Allen Bassett 
  Brian Bassett 
  Cameron Beck 
  David Bernfeld 
  Shannon Berryhill 
  Chris Blanchard 
  Dallin Blanchard 
  Garen Blanchard 
  Koy Blanchard 
  Ryan Blankenship 
  Michael Brown 
  Patrick Brown 
  Dalton Burrup 
  Kaleb Caplin 
  Colby Christophersen 
  Jason Connatser 
  Jack Conville 
  Alan Cooper 
  Austin Couch 
  Paul Coulam 
  Taylor Coulam 
  Joshua Daves Martin
  Seth Dey 
  Jody Dixon 
  Travis Dunnell 
  Alec Falzone 
  David Feldberg
  Ryan Flahive 
  Mason Foltz 
  Austin Fonk 
  Drew Gibson 
  Justin Gilbert 
  Kevan Greunke 
  Jonathan Grimes 
  Garrett Gurthie 
  Allison Haggett 
  Robert Hansen 
  Robby Harris 
  DW Hass 
  Adam Helpingstine 
  Matt Hester 
  Matthew Hill 
  Al Hobbs 
  Britany Horn 
  Bobby Hughes 
  Eric Hughes 
  Jordan Infield 
  Bryan Jungling 
  Clint Kimbrell 
  Jerome Knott 
  Paul Koebke Barsic
  Jeremy Koling 
  Joseph Kozlowski 
  Joseph Kulp 
  Tricia Lafferty 
  Anthony LaMonica 
  Brandon Landis 
  Jake LaPutka 
  Nick Lopez 
  Jerid Ludwig 
  Kesler Martin 
  Adam McJunkin 
  Ben Merzlock 
  Peter Middlecamp 
  Markus Mika 
  Christopher Miller 
  Jordan Miller 
  Keith Miskell 
  Tierney Murphy 
  Bryan Newport 
  Drew Nielsen 
  Conrad Norwood 
  Karina Nowels 
  Dylan Nuetzi 
  Jordan Parks 
  Nicole Pickle Dionisio
  Faith Powell 
  Mitchell Rainey 
  Erik Rasmussen 
  Jory Reid 
  Troy Rugger 
  Alex Sakash 
  Alic Shorey 
  Cooper Siebers 
  Cody Simmons 
  Dan Snyder 
  Jamie Spencer 
  Michael Spencer 
  Todd Springer 
  Kona Star Panis
  Shawn Swapp 
  Alex Tews 
  Adrian Toledo 
  Jack Trageser 
  Robert Tripp 
  Rodney Tripp 
  Marla Tuttle 
  Felix Vega 
  Jessica Weese 
  Forrester Wilson 
  Scott Withers

See also 
 List of disc golf brands and manufacturers
 UDisc

References

External links 
 

2012 establishments in Utah
Companies based in Utah
Online retailers of the United States
Privately held companies based in Utah
Retail companies established in 2012
Sporting goods retailers of the United States
Disc golf retailers